Meekers Hill is a mountain located in the Catskill Mountains of New York southeast of Andes. Dingle Hill is located northwest, and Fords Hill is located northwest of Meekers Hill.

References

Mountains of Delaware County, New York
Mountains of New York (state)